Flags of non-sovereign nations may refer to:
 Flags of formerly independent states, which were independent and have been subsumed into transnational states like the United Kingdom
 Flags of active autonomist and secessionist movements, which are currently part of a transnational state but would like to secede from the state
 Flags of unrecognized states, which have declared independence, but whose independence has not been recognised by the majority of the international community

See also